Martyr or Murderer is a 2023 Filipino family period drama film based on a fictionalized account of the Marcos family's story before and after the People Power Revolution in 1986. Produced and distributed by Viva Films, it is the second installment film by Yap about the Marcoses after the controversial film of Maid in Malacañang that was released in 2022. Directed and written by Darryl Yap and produced by Vincent del Rosario III and Veronique del Rosario-Corpus, the film features Cesar Montano, Cristine Reyes, Diego Loyzaga, Ella Cruz and Ruffa Gutierrez as reprising their roles, along with several cast members; Isko Moreno, Marco Gumabao, Jerome Ponce, Cindy Miranda, Sachzna Laparan, Elizabeth Oropesa and Beverly Salviejo. In the film, three years before the Marcoses fled to Hawaii, of how they were accused of those responsible for assassination of Ninoy Aquino on August 21, 1983.

During the release of Maid in Malacañang, director Darryl Yap revealed in an interview that the film is the first in a trilogy revolving around the Marcos family. Martyr or Murderer is the second film in this trilogy, followed by a third film titled Mabuhay Aloha Mabuhay, which will revolve around the exile to Hawaii of the Marcos family after the People Power Revolution in 1986. Before the release of the trailer, the film was originally planned to be released in February 2023, in time for the anniversary of People Power Revolution but was pushed back to March 1.

Synopsis
The film explores the assassination of Ninoy Aquino on August 21, 1983, three years before the events of Maid in Malacañang, and how the Marcoses were accused of as those responsible for killing him.

The film also delves into the life in exile of the Marcos family and sheds light on Imee Marcos' exploits in Morocco. It also explores the relationship of Ferdinand and Imelda Marcos, the intersection of politics and Philippine culture and the mysterious circumstances surrounding the death of Ninoy Aquino.

Cast
 Cesar Montano as Ferdinand Marcos: The 10th President of the Philippines.
 Marco Gumabao as young Ferdinand Marcos.
 Isko Moreno as Ninoy Aquino: A senator and leader of the opposition during martial law in 1972.
 Jerome Ponce as young Ninoy Aquino.
 Cristine Reyes as Imee Marcos: The eldest daughter of Ferdinand and Imelda Marcos.
 Eula Valdez as older Imee Marcos.
 Diego Loyzaga as Bongbong Marcos: The second child and only son of Ferdinand and Imelda Marcos.
 Aga Muhlach as older Bongbong Marcos.
 Ella Cruz as Irene Marcos: The third child of Ferdinand and Imelda Marcos.
 Ruffa Gutierrez as Imelda Marcos: The wife of Ferdinand Marcos and the First Lady of the Philippines.
 Cindy Miranda as young Imelda Marcos.
 Sachzna Laparan as young Corazon Aquino.
 Franki Russell as Claudia Bermudez: A former girlfriend of Bongbong Marcos.
 Kyle Velino as Greggy Araneta.
 Elizabeth Oropesa as Lucy.
 Beverly Salviejo as Biday.
 Rose Van Ginkel as Maricar: Imee Marcos's confidant on Morocco, North Africa.
 Marlon Mance as Mel Mathay: A former mayor of Quezon City from 1992 to 2001 and boss of Imelda Marcos.
 Billy Jake Cortez as young Mel Mathay.

Production
On October 11, Yap announced on social media that he had started writing the screenplay for Martyr or Murderer. However, Yap expressed that he will step back from his directing role for the sequels and focus on writing their screenplays. On November 7, senator Imee Marcos confirmed that the sequel for Maid in Malacañang is in the works.

Casting
Isko Moreno was cast to play the role of Ninoy Aquino. Additionally, Marco Gumabao, Jerome Ponce and Cindy Miranda will portray the younger versions of Ferdinand Marcos, Ninoy Aquino and Imelda Marcos respectively.

Marketing
The teaser of the film was released on December 22, 2022.

See also
 Historical distortion regarding Ferdinand Marcos
 The Kingmaker (film)

References

2023 films
Cultural depictions of Benigno Aquino Jr.
Cultural depictions of Corazon Aquino
Cultural depictions of Ferdinand Marcos
Filipino-language films
Films about dictators
Films about revolutions
Films set in Manila
Films set in the 1980s
Films set in the 2010s
Obscenity controversies in film
Philippine propaganda films
Tagalog-language films
Viva Films films